John Reed (1633 – 1730) was a member of the Connecticut House of Representatives from Norwalk, Connecticut Colony in the May 1715 and October 1717 sessions.

He was the son of James Reed.

He was an officer in Oliver Cromwell's new model army, and a soldier from the age of sixteen. When Charles II of England was restored to the throne, Reed left for America. He settled first in Providence, Colony of Rhode Island and Providence Plantations. In Providence, he married Anne Samson Derby. He later moved to Rye, Province of New York, in 1684, where he lived for three or four years. He then established himself in the western part of Norwalk, at a house he built on the eastern side of the Five Mile River, north of the Old Post Road and nearly two miles from the Long Island Sound at a place called Reed's Farms. His name is found among the records of the town of Norwalk in 1687. John Reed was admitted to the bar in 1708 in Norwalk, Connecticut. His house was used for a meeting place for some years. His wife died and he married again to the Widow Scofield from Stamford.

He died in Norwalk, in the ninety-eighth year of his age, in 1730, and was interred in a tomb on his own farm.

Notable descendants 
 Third great-grandfather of William Benjamin Reed (1833–1909), mayor of South Norwalk, Connecticut from 1891 to 1892.

References 

1633 births
1730 deaths
Connecticut lawyers
English emigrants
Members of the Connecticut House of Representatives
Politicians from Norwalk, Connecticut
Roundheads
People of colonial Connecticut
Burials in Connecticut
People from Wendron
British emigrants
People of Cornish descent